"On Silent Wings" is a song by American singer-songwriter Tina Turner with guest vocals from English musician Sting. Released in May 1996 in support of Turner's ninth album, Wildest Dreams (1996), the single performed well on the US and Canadian adult contemporary charts, peaking at numbers 24 and 13 respectively. The dance version of "On Silent Wings", remixed by Soul Solution, charted at number 47 on the US Billboard Dance Club Songs chart. Like much of Turner's later work, "On Silent Wings" enjoyed greater success in the United Kingdom, peaking at number 13 on the UK Singles Chart.

The single included the country-flavoured single edit with additional guitar overdubs, later appearing on the 2004 compilation All the Best, as well as a second alternative version of the track. Some formats also featured the non-album track "Do Something", written by Holly Knight and Mike Chapman and produced by Trevor Horn.

Critical reception
Larry Flick from Billboard wrote, "On the eve of La Tina's first stateside concert tour in eons, Virgin plucks one of the strongest and more radio-friendly tunes from the diva's gorgeous (and sadly underappreciated) current disc, Wildest Dreams. Her worldly perspective adds depth to the lyrics of this melancholy rock ballad, which also shows producer Trevor Horn tempering his signature melodramatic keyboard sound with subtle acoustic strumming that never distracts the ear from Turner. Additional programming incentive comes from a laid-back cameo by Sting, though this lovely single would merit the ardent attention of pop, triple-A, and even mainstream rock radio without such stunt casting."

Music video
The accompanying music video released to support the single featured Turner standing on the edge of Table Mountain in Cape Town, Southin a white dress interspersed with live performance clips. The video showcases the concert held at Newlands Cricket Stadium, Noordehoek Beach, Bo-Kaap and Table Mountain, the eight wonder of the world.

Track listings

 US promo CD
 "On Silent Wings" (Trevor Horn remix edit) – 3:43
 "On Silent Wings" (Trevor Horn remix) – 4:20
 Call out research hook – 0:08

 UK CD1 and cassette single
 "On Silent Wings" (single edit)
 "Private Dancer"
 "The Best"
 "I Don't Wanna Lose You"

 UK CD2
 "On Silent Wings" (single edit)
 "Whatever You Want"
 "Do Something"
 "On Silent Wings" (alternative version)

 European CD single
 "On Silent Wings" (single edit)
 "Do Something"

 Australian CD single
 "On Silent Wings" (single edit)
 "Private Dancer"
 "Do Something"
 "I Don't Wanna Lose You"

Charts

Weekly charts

Year-end charts

References

1996 singles
1996 songs
Song recordings produced by Trevor Horn
Songs written by Tony Joe White
Sting (musician) songs
Tina Turner songs
Parlophone singles
Virgin Records singles